The Australian Marijuana Party was an independent  Australian political party that operated in the late 1970s and early 1980s. It campaigned for the decriminalization legalization of marijuana. The party ran candidates in several state and federal elections but never elected a candidate.

The Australian Marijuana Party infuriated a major mutual society by using the same acronym of AMP and among its many slogans was "Plant a Dope in Canberra". The lead candidate was the writer known as JJ McRoach, who ran for the Senate in the State of Victoria. He has written a book about the Australian marijuana scene, entitled "A Dozen Dopey Yarns: Tales from the Pot Prohibition", which includes a chapter on the 1977 election. The book was first published by the Australian Marijuana Party, then reprinted by Angus & Robinson. 

It was one of the first, possibly the first instance where a senate election was used, not to elect a Senator, but to educate people about a particular cause, in this case marijuana law reform. It was successful in its aim with all major media organizations reporting on the Marijuana Party and its antics.

JJ McRoach had a small but strong following from his columns in the then radical independent weekly the Nation Review. Already an experienced journalist, JJ was able to come up with imaginative ideas to win media coverage.

In the States of Victoria and New South Wales, the Marijuana Party ranked fourth in Senate "first preferences" coming dangerously close to  accidentally electing a Marijuana Senator. The AMP won more votes than all the smaller parties combined, including the Democratic Labor Party (DLP) which had previously held the balance of power for many years, but by 1977 was a spent force.

In New South Wales that AMP was just a few hundred votes behind the Australian Democrats and had that been the other way around, the Australia preferential voting system could have delivered a Senator.

Following the election a fund-raising concert 'The Great Green Ball' was held at the Collingwood Town Hall, a Labor Party bastion, but the AMP campaign manager convinced the then Mayor that the AMP was an ALP-friendly party, rather than a rival, and permission was given.

See also 
 Help End Marijuana Prohibition (HEMP) Party

References

New South Wales Government. About NSW: The Australian Marijuana Party Bag

Defunct political parties in Australia
Cannabis political parties of Australia
Single-issue political parties in Australia
Political parties established in the 1970s
1970s establishments in Australia
Political parties disestablished in the 1980s
1980s disestablishments in Australia